Serge Blanc may refer to:
 Serge Blanc (footballer)
 Serge Blanc (violinist)

See also
 Serge Blanco, French rugby union player